The 2017 Mayo Senior Football Championship was the 116th edition of the Mayo GAA's premier Gaelic football tournament for senior clubs in County Mayo, Ireland. Sixteen teams competed with the winner representing Mayo in the Connacht Senior Club Football Championship. The championship started with a group stage and progressed to a knock out stage. The winners received the Paddy Moclair Cup.

Castlebar Mitchels were the defending champions after they defeated Knockmore in the 2016 final. They successfully defended their title to claim a "3-in-a-row" and their 31st title overall when they defeated Ballintubber on a scoreline of 0–15 to 0–13 in McHale Park on 22 October 2017.

The year saw Westport's return to the senior grade after just two seasons outside of the top-flight following relegation in 2014. In March 2017, they claimed the All-Ireland Intermediate Club Football Championship title, defeating Meath champions St Colmcille's in the final.

Clubs
The 2017 Championship was contested by 16 clubs: 5 from South Mayo, 4 from North Mayo, 4 from West Mayo, 3 from East Mayo.

Group stage
All 16 teams entered the competition at this stage. The top 2 teams in each group progressed to the quarter-finals while the bottom team of each group entered a Relegation Playoff. All teams played one home match, one away match and one match at a neutral venue. In the event of two teams finishing on the same points total, placings were decided by head-to-head record between the teams, then by scoring difference.

Group 1

Round 1

Round 2

Round 3

Group 2

Round 1

Round 2

Round 3

Group 3

Round 1

Round 2

Round 3

Group 4

Round 1

Round 2

Round 3

Knock-Out Stage
The top two teams in each group progressed to the knock-out stage. Group winners were drawn against group runners-up, and all games were played at neutral venues.

Quarter-finals

Semi-finals

Final

Relegation Playoffs
The four teams who finished bottom of their groups entered the relegation play-offs, with the two losers of the semi-finals meeting in the relegation play-off final. All games were played at neutral venues. Ballinrobe, as losers of the final, were relegated to the Intermediate Championship for 2018.

Relegation Semi-Finals

Relegation Final

Connacht Senior Club Football Championship

Castlebar Mitchels went forward to represent Mayo in the Connacht Senior Club Football Championship. In the quarter-final they defeated Mohill of Leitrim by five points. They played Tourlestrane of Sligo in the semi-final, winning by seven points. The Connacht final took place in Tuam Stadium, where Castlebar faced reigning champions Corofin. A tightly fought contest ended level at full time, with Corofin eventually winning on a scoreline of 2–13 to 1–12 after extra time.

Awards
The Club Stars, sponsored by The Mayo News, AIB and O'Neills, honoured the best 15 players in the Senior Championship in 2017. The team was selected by Sean Rice (The Mayo News), John Casey (RTÉ Radio analyst), Eamon Clarke (former Knockmore manager) and Austin Garvin (The Mayo News). Awards were also presented for Footballer of the Year, Young Player of the Year, Manager of the Year and Personality of the Year.

Individual Awards

Footballer of the Year - Ger McDonagh (Castlebar)
Young Player of the Year - Niall McManamon (Westport)
Manager of the Year - Declan O'Reilly and Declan Shaw (Castlebar) jointly with John Maughan (Lahardane)
Personality of the Year - Andy Moran (Ballaghaderreen)
Golden Boot - Cillian O'Connor (Ballintubber)

Team of the Year

References

External links

Mayo Senior Football Championship
Mayo Senior Football Championship